Acupuncture and Massage College is a nationally-accredited, private for-profit university in Miami, Florida that specializes in Oriental medicine. The college was founded in 1983 and is the oldest acupuncture school in Florida.

History 
Acupuncture and Massage (AMC) was founded in 1983 as the Acupressure-Acupuncture Institute. In 2000, the school was granted program-accreditation by the Accreditation Commission for Acupuncture and Oriental Medicine (ACAOM) and was re-named the Southeast Institute of Oriental Medicine (SEIOM), to reflect a broader commitment to Oriental Medicine education. In 2003, SEIOM was granted college status, and the name was changed again to Acupuncture and Massage College.

Academics 
Acupuncture and Massage College is nationally-accredited by the Accrediting Commission of Career Schools and Colleges (ACCSC). It awards a Master's degree in Oriental medicine, which provides education and clinical training in Traditional Chinese Medicine, including acupuncture, Chinese herbs, and Bodywork therapy. The Master's degree is accredited by ACAOM and is approved by the State of Florida Board of Acupuncture. The college also awards a professional certification in Massage Therapy, which is approved by the State of Florida Board of Massage Therapy.

Notable alumni 
Ricky Williams

References

External links 

 

Educational institutions established in 1983
Universities and colleges in Miami metropolitan area
1983 establishments in Florida